Gabrk is a Slovene place name that may refer to:

Gabrk, Ilirska Bistrica, a settlement in the Municipality of Ilirska Bistrica, southwestern Slovenia
Gabrk, Škofja Loka, a settlement in the Municipality of Škofja Loka, northwestern Slovenia